"All in My Head (Flex)" is a song recorded by American group Fifth Harmony, featuring vocals by rapper Fetty Wap, for their second studio album, 7/27 (2016), which was released on May 27, 2016. It was produced by Stargate and Brian Garcia with additional production by Sir Nolan. Musically, "All in My Head (Flex)" is a reggae-trap song backed by synths, percussion, and guitar, containing an interpolation of the 1992 song "Flex" by Mad Cobra. The song was released as second single after a special encore performance on Xfinity following the 2016 Billboard Music Awards on May 22, 2016. The single was serviced to rhythmic contemporary radio stations in the United States on May 31, 2016.

Commercially, the song reached number 24 on the United States' Billboard Hot 100. The song also reached the top 40 in Australia, New Zealand, the United Kingdom, Canada and Ireland. To promote the song, the group performed on the season 22 finale of Dancing with the Stars. The song's accompanying music video, set on a tropical beach, was directed by Director X and premiered on the Vevo platform on June 23, 2016. "All in My Head (Flex)" won the category Song of Summer at the 2016 MTV Video Music Awards.

Production and composition

Prior to the release of their second studio album 7/27, Fifth Harmony member Dinah Jane shared her thoughts on her favorite album track "All in My Head (Flex)" on Instagram: "The vibe and rhythm to this I feel represents me best as a South Pacific Islander [...] This is just one of those feel-good songs that you can't help but jam to, no matter where you're at or who you're with!" "All in My Head (Flex)" was written by Fifth Harmony's members, with Stargate, Benny Blanco, Fetty Wap, Tory Lanez, Sir Nolan, Julia Michaels, and Brian Garcia. The song was recorded by Mikkel Storleer Eriksen, Miles Walker and Mike Anderson at Westlake Recording Studios in Los Angeles and Hide Out Studios in London, England. Singer Victoria Monét produced the group's vocals. Mixing was done Phil Tan at the Callanwolde Fine Arts Center with assistance from Daniela Rivera. Eriksen and Hermansen provided all the instrumentation. The group debuted the song during a performance at the 2016 Billboard Music Awards on May 22, 2016. It was released on digital platforms after the performance as an instant gratification track to accompany digital pre-orders of 7/27. The song was serviced to rhythmic format radio stations in the United States on May 31, 2016. and was selected as an impacting song on contemporary hit radio on June 14, 2016.

Musically, "All In My Head (Flex)" is a reggae-trap song. The song is three minutes and thirty-seconds in length and samples the song "Flex" by Jamaican musician Mad Cobra which itself interpolated elements of The Temptations' "Just My Imagination". Its instrumentation consists of guitar, percussion, synthesized Finger snapping snaps and synths creating an electronic-reggae beat. The song opens with Hansen singing the chorus featuring guitar chords and crisp clicks. Following the rap performed by Fetty Wap, Ally Brooke belts out  the first verse: "Curtains like waves closing in all around us, dimming the lights just so that they don't blind us," backed by the percussion and guitar chords. Concerning his collaboration on "All in My Head (Flex)", Fetty Wap told Billboard that during the recording, his voice "wasn't as mature as it is now" and described it as "impossible" to perform on stage; "Like, I smoke way too much now. No more high-range. If you were actually to hear the first version to that song, I do not sound anything like that. It was way high up there. So when we changed everything I was like I don't think they going to like it because it felt like I took the energy from it. But they were like we love it, we rocking with it."

Critical reception
Peter Meister of website Sputnikmusic described the song as "sassy and badass, Fetty Wap flexes his muscle with might within the funky, glowing synths crashing with the industrialized percussion which breaks free and explodes at all angles". In a brief album review, the New York Post noted the song has "a jaunty electronic reggae-ish beat". Digital Spy's Lewis Corner described the song as having an "urban-pop undertone, which is brought to life with light reggae guitar plucks and crisp clicks". Christopher R. Weingarter of Rolling Stone felt that the Caribbean rhythms hinted at in Reflection's track "Them Girls Be Like" "burst forth" in "All In My Head (Flex)" and "Gonna Get Better". USA Todays Maeve McDermott gave the song a positive review writing: "With reggae upstrokes, a swaggering chorus and a welcome Fetty Wap feature, "All In My Head" is summertime in a song."

Describing the song as  "reggaeton-inflected" the Los Angeles Times Gerrick D. Kennedy believed that "All In My Head (Flex)", as well as another 7/27 track, "Not That Kinda Girl," "are the album's most infectious offerings". Spins editor, Brian Josephs, complimented the song's reggae production and the group's sensual performance; however, he had a negative view of Fetty Wap's appearance commenting that the rapper "fails to come off here as much more than Default Guest Rapper". However, Spencer Kornhaber of The Atlantic felt that "All In My Head (Flex) brings in the most exuberant rapper of our times, Fetty Wap, to very catchy effect."

Commercial performance
"All in My Head (Flex)" debuted at number 78 on the US Billboard Hot 100 chart dated July 9, 2016, and in the same week the song climbed from the number 32 to the number 26 on the Mainstream Top 40. Following the release of its accompanying music video, the song rose from number 78 to number 40 on the Hot 100 prompted by a 115% sales increase with 17,000 downloads sold. In its new position, the song had a radio audience of 24 million - a 42% increase, and it also debuted at number 32 on the Streaming Songs chart with 7.1 million streams in the United States (up 112% percent). For the week ending August 6, 2016, the song climbed from number 37 to number 29 on the Hot 100, giving the group its third top 30 song. The song peaked at number 24 on the chart dated August 20, 2016. It has sold over 1 million equivalent units in the United States and has been certified platinum by the Recording Industry Association of America.

The song debuted at number 42 on the Canadian Hot 100 chart for the week ending July 16, 2016. In its ninth charting week, the song jumped one position peaking at 21 on the chart. In Australia, it entered the ARIA Singles Chart at number 66 on the chart dated June 4, 2016, and peaked at number 19 on the chart. The song debuted at number 35 on the New Zealand Singles Chart for the week ending June 20, 2016, and peaked at number 8. It debuted at number 82 on the United Kingdom's Official Singles Chart issued for July 8, 2016, and peaked number 25.

Music video

Background
The music video, directed by Director X, was filmed in Malibu, California on May 17, 2016. Critics commented on the summer scenery of the video. Gil Kaufman from Billboard said that the group is "dancing and serving up their best surfside poses while singing the reggae-tinged song on a picturesque beach". Commenting on the video's integration of the track's themes, Anna Gaca of Spin wrote the video "takes the song's reggae-tinged vibe to its natural conclusion with a sun-kissed, oceanside party and, naturally, an appearance by guest star Fetty Wap". As of October 2021, the video has over 430 million views on YouTube.

Synopsis

The video begins with cinematic black bars expanding to reveal the scenery, which is set in a beach. Individual takes of the girls are shown momentarily as Dinah Jane sings the chorus. The camera shifts to Fetty Wap, who is sitting down in a chair with a guitar next to him. As he sings, the girls are seen dancing in the water, with Lauren Jauregui kicking the water as the video goes into a slow-motion take for less than a second. Several scenes include Normani alone in a rock cliff, a close-up of Dinah singing and a shot of the girls together near the water.

Ally Brooke then sings as she lays in the sand, moving sensually as an attractive man comes out of the water towards her. The camera fades to Lauren, who sings the bridge as she stands next to a background of rocks, as a take of another man is shown. The group is then scattered in different spots standing in a large rock formation, where shots of Dinah alone are spliced as she sings the chorus. Normani shares the chorus, as she sings on top of the rock cliff, shown earlier in the video. Camila Cabello seductively lays down and grabs her hair, in similarity to Ally. Several men approach the girls as they arrive in a convertible Jeep Wrangler. They greet and socialize with each other.

The scene changes to a beach-like bar equipped with cabanas and sand scattered through the floor. Each girl is dressed in beach draps and dance with a man as the scene interchanges with Fetty Wap's rap verse. A product placement for the app Friendable with the group's invitation is shown. The girls perform a dance routine in-sync as Normani and Dinah are shown individually dancing near a rock and on the sand. The video ends with each making a pose as the cinematic black bars close.

Live performances
The group performed the song for the first time on television on May 22, 2016, during a special encore performance on Xfinity following the 2016 Billboard Music Awards, where they also performed "Work from Home". During the show, the group performed wearing white outfits with Cuban flags in the background. On May 24, 2016, the group performed the song on the season 22 finale of Dancing with the Stars on a Carnival-inspired set. The quintet also performed the single on June 13, 2016, on the iHeartRadio Honda Stage in Los Angeles. While promoting in Australia, they performed the song on the Grand Finale of the fifth season of The Voice, and on Sunrise.

Track listing
Digital download – single
"All in My Head (Flex)" (featuring Fetty Wap) – 3:30

US CD single
"All in My Head (Flex)" (featuring Fetty Wap; super clean) – 3:30
"All in My Head (Flex)" (featuring Fetty Wap) – 3:30
"All in My Head (Flex)" (no Rap) – 2:53
"All in My Head (Flex)" (Instrumental) – 3:30

Personnel and credits
Recording
 Recorded at Westlake Studios (Los Angeles), Windmark Recording (Santa Monica, California) and The Hide Out Studios (London, England)
 Mixed at Callanwolde Fine Arts Center (Atlanta, California)
 Mastered at The Mastering Place (New York City)

Sample
 Contains a portion of the composition "Flex" written by Ewart Brown, Clifton Dillon, Richard Foulks, Herbert Harris, Daniel Gonzalez and Handel Tucker and performed by Mad Cobra

Personnel
Mikkel Storleer Eriksen – production, instrumentation, recording
Tor Erik Hermansen – production, instrumentation
Willie Maxwell – featured artist, songwriter
Brian Garcia – production
Victoria Monét – vocal production
Ally Brooke – vocals
Camila Cabello – vocals
Dinah Jane Hansen – vocals
Lauren Jauregui – vocals
Normani – vocals
Mike Anderson – recording
Miles Walker – recording
Phil Tan – mixing
Daniela Rivera – mixing assistant
Jason Golberg – recording assistant
Dave Kutch – mastering

Credits adapted from 7/27s liner notes.

Charts

Weekly charts

Year-end charts

Certifications

Release history

References

External links
 

2016 songs
2016 singles
American reggae songs
Epic Records singles
Fetty Wap songs
Fifth Harmony songs
Music videos directed by Director X
Reggae fusion songs
Songs written by Camila Cabello
Songs written by Lauren Jauregui
Songs written by Fetty Wap
Songs written by Mikkel Storleer Eriksen
Songs written by Tor Erik Hermansen
Songs written by Benny Blanco
Songs written by Sir Nolan
Songs written by Julia Michaels
Songs written by Simon Wilcox
Songs written by Normani
Songs written by Ally Brooke
Songs written by Dinah Jane
Syco Music singles
Songs written by Tory Lanez